Lissie is an unincorporated community in Wharton County, Texas, United States. It is located along U.S. Highway 90A in northern Wharton County.

Geography
According to the Handbook of Texas, the community had an estimated population of 49 in 2000.

Lissie has a post office with the ZIP code 77454. Public education in the community of Lissie is provided by the East Bernard Independent School District.

Notable people
 James Garrett Freeman - murderer

Gallery

References

External links
 

Unincorporated communities in Wharton County, Texas
Unincorporated communities in Texas